Podelmis aenea, is a species of riffle beetle found in Sri Lanka.

Adult beetles are found on stones closer to the freshwater sources.

References 

Elmidae
Insects of Sri Lanka
Insects described in 1973